Isaac Thompson Carree III (born April 28, 1973) is an American gospel musician. He started his music career, in 1990, with the Gospel legend John P. Kee, yet his solo career commenced in 2011, with the release of Uncommon Me by Sovereign Agency. His second album, Reset, was released by Door 6 in 2013. Both albums charted on The Billboard 200 along with chartings on Gospel Albums and Independent Albums charts.

Early life
Carree was born in Greensboro, North Carolina, on April 28, 1973, as Isaac Thompson Carree III, to his mother Pastor Nancy Wilson of New Beginnings Community Outreach Church in Greensboro, North Carolina and father Isaac Thompson Carree, Jr.

Music career
His music career got started in the early 1990s as a member of Pastor John P Kee's New Life Community Choir (NLCC), being featured on the song "Wave It Away." In 1995 Carree left the NLCC to begin work with the gospel music group Men of Standard, a group that has recorded five projects that charted on Billboard's Gospel Albums Chart; however, his solo career commenced in 2011, with the release of Uncommon Me by Sovereign Agency on August 23, 2011. This album was his breakthrough release on the Billboard magazine charts, with chartings on The Billboard 200 at No. 48, Gospel Albums at No. 1, and at the No. 5 position on the Independent Albums chart. Carree won a Stellar Award for his debut solo album. The subsequent album, Reset, released on May 25, 2013 by Door 6 Records. The album charted on all three of the aforementioned chart with the album placing at No. 41 on The Billboard 200, No. 1 on the Gospel Albums, and Independent Albums at No. 10.

Personal life
Carree is married to Dietra, and they have a daughter Alexis Carree, son, Isaac Thompson Carree IV, and a daughter together, Alaina Monet Carree. They reside in Atlanta, Georgia.

Discography

References

1973 births
Living people
African-American songwriters
African-American Christians
Musicians from Atlanta
Musicians from North Carolina
Songwriters from Georgia (U.S. state)
Songwriters from North Carolina
21st-century African-American people
20th-century African-American people